Cacia semiluctuosa is a species of beetle in the family Cerambycidae. It was described by Blanchard in 1853.

Subspecies
 Cacia semiluctuosa reducta Breuning, 1939
 Cacia semiluctuosa semiluctuosa Blanchard, 1853

References

Cacia (beetle)
Beetles described in 1853